Le Mont may refer to:

Places
France
Le Mont, Vosges, in the Vosges department
Le Mont, Jura department, now integrated into Dramelay
Le Mont, hamlet in the commune Sixt-Fer-à-Cheval
Le Mont-Dieu, in the Ardennes department
Le Mont-Saint-Adrien, in the Oise department
Le Mont-Saint-Michel, in the Manche department
Le Mont-Dore (France), Puy-de-Dôme
Le Mont-Mesly, quarter of Créteil
Switzerland
Le Mont-sur-Lausanne, in the canton of Vaud
FC Le Mont Swiss football club based in Le Mont-sur-Lausanne

See also
Mont (disambiguation)